Les Hughson Jr. (born 1 December 1938) was an Australian rules footballer who played with Fitzroy in the Victorian Football League (VFL).

Early life and family
Hughson was born on 1 December 1938. His father Les Hughson Sr, who played for a record five VFL clubs including Fitzroy, was at the time coach of Stawell. Two uncles also had significant VFL careers, both for Fitzroy. Most famous was Fred Hughson who captain-coached Fitzroy to the 1944 premiership and the other, Mick Hughson, played 95 games for the club.

Career
Hughson, who wore the number eight, had an injury plagued career at Fitzroy. He played mostly as a defender.

Captain of the Fitzroy thirds in 1957, Hughson came into the senior team for the first time in the 1958 VFL season. He was only able to play a total of 28 games in his five-season career, the most nine appearances in 1960, which included a preliminary final.

A serious knee injury sustained in a game against Collingwood at Victoria Park in 1962 meant he had to undergo a cartilage operation. When he returned to training in 1963 he was forced to retire on medical advice. Fitzroy then appointed him as the club's runner.

References

External links

1938 births
Living people
Australian rules footballers from Victoria (Australia)
Fitzroy Football Club players